"S tou nádejou choď spať" is a duet by Marika Gombitová and Janko Lehotský, originally recorded in 1978.

The song, written by Lehotský and Boris Filan, topped on the Slovak TV hitparade Našich 9 in 1978. However, for the first time, being released in 2010 on the Gombitová's duets compilation Duetá issued by OPUS.

Official versions
1978: "S tou nádejou choď spať" - original version

Credits and personnel
 Marika Gombitová - lead vocal
 Janko Lehotský - lead vocal, writer
 Boris Filan - lyrics
 Modus - band

Awards

Našich 9
Našich 9 was one of the Slovak TV music programs, in which either artists, or upcomers themselves competed by presenting their songs. The show ran from 1975 to 1979, and the others popular also were Chose a Song (1967–76), A Chance for the Talented (1976–83), 6+1 (1979–83), and 5xP. S tou nádejou choď spať peaked the television show in 1978.

Cover version
 2007: Janko Lehotský & Gabriela Škrabáková (released on Priatelia a čiernobiely svet by Lehotský)

References

General

Specific

External links 
 
 

1978 songs
Marika Gombitová songs
Modus (band) songs
Songs written by Ján Lehotský
Slovak-language songs